Leipziger Land is a former district in Saxony, Germany. It was bounded by (from the north and clockwise) the districts of Delitzsch, the district-free city Leipzig, Muldentalkreis, Mittweida, the district Altenburger Land in Thuringia, and the districts Burgenlandkreis, Saalekreis in Saxony-Anhalt.

History 

The history of the region is influenced by the city of Leipzig. See there for more information.

In 1999, the towns of Schkeuditz and Taucha were reassigned to the Delitzsch district. In August 2008, it became a part of the new district of Leipzig.

Geography 
The main river of the district is the White Elster, which also flows through the city of Leipzig itself. The area south of Leipzig is a big lignite day mining area, which will be recultivated as a lakeland in the near future. The lignite also made the area the main industrial area of East Germany.

Coat of arms

Towns and municipalities

References

External links 
  Official website (German)